Lanthanum(III) oxide, also known as lanthana, chemical formula , is an inorganic compound containing the rare earth element lanthanum and oxygen. It is used in some ferroelectric materials, as a component of optical materials, and is a feedstock for certain catalysts, among other uses.

Properties

Lanthanum oxide is a white solid that is insoluble in water, but dissolves in acidic solutions.  absorbs moisture from air, converts to lanthanum hydroxide. 
Lanthanum oxide has p-type semiconducting properties and a band gap of approximately 5.8 eV. Its average room temperature resistivity is 10 kΩ·cm, which decreases with an increase in temperature.  has the lowest lattice energy of the rare earth oxides, with very high dielectric constant, ε = 27.

Structure
At low temperatures,  has an A- hexagonal crystal structure. The  metal atoms are surrounded by a 7 coordinate group of  atoms, the oxygen ions are in an octahedral shape around the metal atom and there is one oxygen ion above one of the octahedral faces. On the other hand, at high temperatures lanthanum oxide converts to a C- cubic crystal structure. The  ion is surrounded by six  ions in a hexagonal configuration.

Synthesis
Lanthanum oxide can crystallize in at least three polymorphs.

Hexagonal  has been produced by spray pyrolysis of lanthanum chloride. 

An alternative route to obtaining hexagonal  involves precipitation of nominal  from aqueous solution using a combination of 2.5%  and the surfactant sodium dodecyl sulfate followed by heating and stirring for 24 hours at 80 °C:

Other routes include:

Reactions
Lanthanum oxide is used as an additive to develop certain ferroelectric materials, such as La-doped bismuth titanate ( - BLT).

Potential applications
Lanthanum oxide is most useful as a precursor to other lanthanum compounds. Neither the oxide nor any of the derived materials enjoys substantial commercial value, unlike some of the other lanthanides.

 forms glasses of high density, refractive index, and hardness. Together with oxides of tungsten, tantalum, and thorium,  improves the resistance of the glass to attack by alkali.  is an ingredient in some  piezoelectric and thermoelectric materials.

 has been examined for the oxidative coupling of methane.

References

Lanthanum compounds
Inorganic compounds
Sesquioxides